The Minister of State for Employment is a mid-level position in the Department for Work and Pensions in the British government.

History
The office was previously held by Julie Marson following the resignation of Mims Davies on 6 July 2022.

Responsibilities
The minister's responsibilities include:

responsibility for departmental strategy on the labour market, unemployment and in work progression, with a focus on under-represented groups, young people and skills
in-work conditionality including sanctions
international labour market *policy (International Labour Organization (ILO), G20, Employment, Social Policy, Health and Consumer Affairs Council (EPSCO))
European Social Fund (ESF) and UK Shared Prosperity Fund (UKSPF)
work services and Jobcentre Plus partnership working
Jobcentre Plus campaigns
Jobseeker's Allowance, Income Support
People and Location Programme
Youth Obligation Support Programme
Flexible Support Fund
labour market interventions for self-employment (including the New Enterprise Allowance and future offer and the Minimum Income Floor)
benefit cap
Health and Safety Executive

List of Employment Ministers

References

Department for Work and Pensions
Labour ministers of the United Kingdom